Pamukova YHT station is railway station, currently under construction, on the Istanbul-Ankara high-speed railway just south of Pamukova, Turkey. The station was originally expected to open in 2015, but due to political instability between the June and November 2015 Turkish presidential elections, the opening date has been pushed back. As of 2016 the tracks are complete, but construction on the station itself hasn't begun.

Pamukova District
Railway stations in Sakarya Province
High-speed railway stations in Turkey
Railway stations under construction in Turkey